Bill Bentley (born August 24, 1950, Houston, Texas, United States) is an American music industry executive, particularly notable for having produced tribute albums of the music of significant cult artists Roky Erickson (1990), Skip Spence (1999), Doug Sahm (2009) and Lou Reed (2013), in addition to other recording projects.

History
Bill Bentley was born in Houston, Texas in 1950 and attended Lamar High School. He commenced playing drums at an early age. His music career started at the age of fifteen, when he interned at the KYOK-AM radio station in Houston. While in high school, he formed a band called The Aggregation, the local rivals of which were The Coachmen, from neighbouring Lee High School and featuring guitarist Billy Gibbons, later of ZZ Top. Bentley grew up in the newspaper business; his father, Bud Bentley, was a cartoonist and later the art director at the Houston Post.

Bentley attended Southwestern University in Georgetown, Texas and later the University of Texas at Austin, where he joined a band of English majors called The Bizarros. The band was notable for including Velvet Underground founding member Sterling Morrison. Bentley had also developed an admiration for the 13th Floor Elevators during the Sixties, following the band extensively to dozens of Houston concerts starting at La Maison in 1965 on through to their last performances at Love Street Light Circus and Feel Good Machine in 1968.

Bentley had developed typesetting skills, and was able to use these as an entry to a position in 1974 as the music editor at the Austin Sun bi-weekly newspaper. In 1978, Bentley became the in-house publicist for KLRN-TV in Austin, as well as for the stations' long-running television show Austin City Limits.

In 1980, he became the music editor at the L.A. Weekly, being one of six people forming the core of the first editorial staff at that paper.

Entering the record business, Bentley became the director of publicity at Slash Records and rose to become a senior vice president of media relations at Warner Bros. Records. In his role as a publicist, he has worked with such artists as Los Lobos, Elvis Costello, The Blasters, Green Day, X, Lou Reed, The Red Hot Chili Peppers and R.E.M. As a record company executive, he has provided guidance to the careers of such artists as Doug Sahm, ZZ Top and Wilco. In addition, throughout a career in music that spans over forty years, he has been a writer of liner notes to numerous record releases.

In 1990, upon learning of the financial distress of Roky Erickson, founder of the 13th Floor Elevators, Bentley organized a tribute album for him, for the purpose of raising funds. The result was Where the Pyramid Meets the Eye: A Tribute to Roky Erickson, released on Sire Records, part of the Warner Bros. Records group with which Bentley was then associated. Similarly, in 1999, when Bentley learned that Moby Grape co-founder Skip Spence was seriously ill with cancer and facing mounting medical bills, Bentley again organized a tribute album: More Oar: A Tribute to the Skip Spence Album, released on Birdman Records. In 1992, Bentley was instrumental in restarting the career of Jimmy Scott, acting as executive producer and writing the liner notes for Scott's comeback album, All The Way, which was also released on Sire Records.

Bentley is also notable for his efforts to enhance public appreciation of the contributions of particular artists. For example, he is the executive producer of a retrospective Roky Erickson compilation, I Have Always Been Here Before: The Roky Erickson Anthology (Shout! Factory, 2005) and a tribute album to Doug Sahm, Keep Your Soul: A Tribute to Doug Sahm (Vanguard, 2009), recorded and released nearly ten years after Sahm's death. Similarly, Bentley was associated with the 1992 compilation of O.V. Wright material, Soul of O.V. Wright, released twelve years after Wright's untimely death, at the age of forty-one.

Bentley was with Warner Bros. Records from 1986 to 2006, at which point he became the personal public relations representative of Neil Young, as well as the chief executive officer of Sonic Boomers Inc., an internet-based music news and information site, modeled "as something like Pitchfork Media for the older set, or maybe something like No Depression on the Web." He also became the A & R Director at Vanguard Records, where his first signing was Merle Haggard. He joined Concord Records's A&R department in 2015, and was A&R director for Alejandro Escovedo's Burn Something Beautiful release. He also co-produced the 6-CD set Otis Redding Live at the Whisky a Go Go: The Complete Recordings. Bentley remains a longtime contributor of music reviews and music articles to the Austin Chronicle. and writes the monthly reviews column Bentley's Bandstand at www.americanahighways.org.

Bentley's first book, Smithsonian Rock & Roll: Live and Unseen, was published by Smithsonian Books in October 2017. He is presently writing for Neil Young Archives, and started Water Bros. Films in 2019. The company is developing a documentary on longtime music manager Elliot Roberts (Joni Mitchell, Neil Young, Geffen-Roberts Management, Bob Dylan, Tom Petty and others), who passed away in 2019. Bentley produced a second tribute album for the late singer Roky Erickson, titled May the Circle Remain Unbroken, released by Light in the Attic Records in 2021, and is presently producing a tribute album to Lou Reed titled The Power of the Heart, to be released by Light in the Attic Records in October 2023.

Credits

 1972 Greatest Hits Little Milton (Chess/MCA) Liner Notes
 1975 Electromagnets Electromagnets (EGM Records) Liner Notes
 1987 Just Say Yes: Sire's Winter CD Music Sampler Various Artists(Sire) Writer, Liner Notes, Editing
 1988 Opal: Assembly 1 Various Artists (Opal Records) Liner Notes
 1989 Joe "King" Carrasco and The Crowns Joe "King" Carrasco (Stiff/Tornado) Liner Notes, Reissue Producer
 1990 Good Old Funky Music The Meters (Rounder) Liner Notes
 1990 Just Say Da: Volume IV of Just Say Yes Various Artists (Sire) Liner Notes
 1990 L.A. Ya Ya Various Artists (High Tone) Liner Notes
 1990 Songs for Drella Lou Reed and John Cale (Sire) Liner Notes
 1990 Where the Pyramid Meets the Eye: A Tribute to Roky Erickson Various Artists (Sire) Liner Notes, Executive Producer, Album Supervision
 1991 Allen Toussaint Collection Allen Toussaint (Reprise) Compilation
 1992 All the Way Jimmy Scott (Sire) Liner Notes, Executive Producer
 1992 Grey Ghost Grey Ghost (Spindletop) Liner Notes
 1992 Soul of O.V. Wright O.V. Wright(MCA) Liner Notes, Compilation
 1993 Velvet Redux: Live MCMXCIII The Velvet Underground (Sire/Warner Bros./Reprise) Liner Notes
 1994 Bird Nest on the Ground Doyle Bramhall (Antone's) Liner Notes
 1994 Can't Live Without It Various Artists(Antone's) Liner Notes
 1994 One Foot in the Blues ZZ Top (Warner Bros. Records) Liner Notes
 1994 Short Fuse The Blazers (Rounder) Liner Notes
 1994 Words + Music Ry Cooder (Warner Bros./Reprise) Interviewer
 1994 Z Zelebration: A Tribute to the Late Great Z.Z. Hill Various Artists (Malaco) Liner Notes
 1996 4 Aces Texas Tornados (Reprise) Executive Producer
 1997 Anthology: The Elektra Years The Paul Butterfield Blues Band (Elektra) Compilation
 1997 Little Bit Is Better Than Nada: The Nada Mixes Texas Tornados (Reprise) Executive Producer
 1997 Live on Letterman: Music from the Late Show Various Artists (Reprise) Producer, Associate Producer
 1997 A Tone for My Sins Denny Freeman (Dallas Blues Society) Liner Notes
 1999 More Oar: A Tribute to the Skip Spence Album Various Artists (Birdman) Producer, Liner Notes
 2000 Blues at Sunrise Stevie Ray Vaughan & Double Trouble (Epic/Legacy) Liner Notes
 2000 Return of Wayne Douglas Doug Sahm (Tornado) Executive Producer
 2000 SRV Stevie Ray Vaughan & Double Trouble (Epic/Legacy) Liner Notes
 2001 Labour of Love: The Music of Nick Lowe Various Artists (Telarc) Liner Notes
 2004 Animal Serenade Lou Reed (RCA) Executive Producer
 2004 Genuine Texas Groover: Complete Atlantic Recordings Doug Sahm Liner Notes, Compilation Producer
 2005 Heard It on the X Los Super Seven (Telarc) Liner Notes
 2005 I Have Always Been Here Before: The Roky Erickson Anthology Roky Erickson (Shout! Factory) Liner Notes, Compilation Co-Producer (With Gary Stewart)
 2005 Just Say Sire: The Sire Records Story Various Artists (Rhino) Liner Notes
 2006 Complete Atlantic Sessions Willie Nelson Liner Notes
 2006 Definitive Collection Delbert McClinton Liner Notes
 2006 Fishing with Charlie and Other Selected Readings Jim Dickinson (Birdman) Liner Notes
 2007 Goin' Home: A Tribute to Fats Domino Various Artists (Vanguard) Advisor
 2007 Night In New Orleans Eddie Zip (DJM) Liner Notes
 2008 World of Peace Must Come Stephen John Kalinich (Light In The Attic Records) Liner Notes, Executive Producer, Essay

Vanguard Records:
 2009 Keep Your Soul: A Tribute to Doug Sahm Various Artists, Executive Producer/Liner notes
 2010 The Gathering Diane Schuur, A&R
 2010 I Am What I Am Merle Haggard, A&R
 2011 Old Mad Joy The Gourds, A&R
 2011 Beyond the Sun Chris Isaak, A&R
 2011 Working in Tennessee Merle Haggard, A&R
 2013 Wrote a Song for Everyone John Fogerty, A&R
 2013 Carly Ritter Carly Ritter, A&R
 2014 Lou Joseph Arthur, Executive Producer
 2014 Rock & Roll Time Jerry Lee Lewis, A&R
 2015 Soul Food The Word, A&R
 2015 First Comes the Night Chris Isaak, A&R

Concord Music:
2016 Burn Something Beautiful Alejandro Escovedo, A&R (Fantasy Records)
2016 Live at the Whisky a Go Go: The Complete Recordings Otis Redding, Co-Producer (Stax Records)

Light in the Attic Records:
2021 May the Circle Remain Unbroken: A Tribute to Roky Erickson, Album Producer. Featuring Billy F Gibbons, Lucinda Williams, Charlie Sexton & Alison Mosshart, Chelsea Wolfe, Ty Segall, Mark Lanegan & Lynn Castle, Jeff Tweedy, Margo Price, Neko Case, Brogan Bentley, The Black Angels and Gary Clark Jr. & Eve Monsees. (July 17, 2021)

Smithsonian Books:
2017 Smithsonian Rock & Roll: Live and Unseen by Bill Bentley (October 24, 2017)

References

1950 births
Musicians from Houston
Lamar High School (Houston, Texas) alumni
Musicians from Austin, Texas
Record producers from Texas
Living people